Renmin Bridge (literally “People’s Bridge”) is a bridge crossing the Pearl River in Guangzhou, Guangdong, China.On its north is 623 Rd (六二三路)

Renmin Bridge connects Haizhu District with Liwan District, and was the second highway bridge to be put into service in Guangzhou (after Haizhu Bridge) when it was completed in 1967. Guangzhou's Inner Ring Road passes over the bridge, making it a major traffic artery in the city.

Guangzhou's annual Dragon Boat Race takes place between Renmin Bridge and Jiefang Bridge.

Scenic Shamian Island lies directly upstream (east) of the bridge.

References

Bridges in Guangzhou
Bridges over the Pearl River (China)
Bridges completed in 1967
Beam bridges in China